Header is an Australian power pop band that formed in Perth in 1994.

Their single "Restoration" was engineered by Chris Dickie who earned a nomination for the 1996 ARIA Music Awards for Engineer of the Year for this and two other releases.

Members
Ian Freeman (vocals)
Dave Chadwick (guitar)
Brad Bolton (guitar)
Liam Coffey (bass, vocals)
Dean Willoughby (drums)

Discography

Albums

EPs
 Header (1995, Fish Bowl)
 Sugafix (1995, Bark)
 Crazy Head (1996, Bark)
 Brazen Head (1996, Bark)

Singles

Awards and nominations

ARIA Music Awards
The ARIA Music Awards is an annual awards ceremony that recognises excellence, innovation, and achievement across all genres of Australian music. They commenced in 1987. 

! 
|-
| 1996
| Chris Dickie  for "Restoration" by Header
|ARIA Award for Engineer of the Year
| 
| 
|-

References

Western Australian musical groups